George W. Dorn (1836–1891) was the first President of the Chico Board of Trustees in 1872, when the city of Chico, California was first incorporated. He was the proprietor of Dorn's General Store at Second and Main Streets in downtown Chico.

On February 5, 1872, the first municipal election was held for members of the Board of Trustees. Upon election, the first trustees chose the length of their terms by lot. Dorn served for one year.

He is buried in the Chico Cemetery.

References 

1836 births
1891 deaths
American merchants
Mayors of Chico, California
People from Ohio
19th-century American politicians
19th-century American businesspeople